Eugene Onegin is a novel in verse by Alexander Pushkin.

Eugene Onegin may also refer to:

 Eugene Onegin (opera), an 1879 opera by Pyotr Tchaikovsky
 Eugene Onegin (1959 film), a 1959 Soviet opera film
 Eugene Onegin (1911 film), a 1911 Russian short film
 Onegin (film), a 1999 British-American romantic drama film
 Onegin (Cranko), ballet created by John Cranko